Glyptoscelimorpha viridis is a species of false jewel beetle in the family Schizopodidae. It is found in North America.

References

Further reading

 
 
 

Schizopodidae
Articles created by Qbugbot
Beetles described in 1931